The Trey o' Hearts is a 1914 American 15-chapter action film serial directed by Wilfred Lucas and Henry MacRae. It was written by Allan Dwan and Bess Meredyth, based on a story of the same name by Louis Joseph Vance. The first chapter ran 3 reels, while the others were two-reelers. The film is currently considered to be lost. Some sources list Lon Chaney in the cast (uncredited), but this is disputed and unconfirmed.

Plot
An evil young woman named Judith Trine and her father are plotting to destroy Alan Law, because for many years her father hated Alan's father, and now they have transferred that hatred onto Alan himself. Judith's twin sister Rose (also played by Cleo Madison) is in love with Alan. As the serial progresses, Alan manages to survive a number of life-threatening events. Over time, Judith finds herself falling in love with Alan. On the day of their wedding in a chapel, Rose and Alan are struck by lightning. Rose is killed, and Alan is badly injured. Unbeknownst to Alan, Judith takes Rose's place and nurses him back to health.

Cast
 Cleo Madison as Rose Trine / Judith Trine
 George Larkin as Alan Law, the hero
 Edward Sloman as Seneca Trine, the father
 Tom Walsh as Barcus
 Roy Hanford as Marrophat, the villain
 Charles Brinley
 Doris Pawn

Chapter titles
Flower o' Flames (released August 4, 1914)
White Water (August 11)
The Sea Venture (August 18)
Dead Reckoning (August 25)
The Sunset Tide (September 1)
The Crack o' Doom (September 8)
The Stalemate (September 15)
The Mock Rose (September 22)
As the Crow Flies (September 29)
Steel Ribbons (October 6)
The Painted Hills (October 13)
The Mirage (October 20)
The Jaws of Death (October 27)
The First Law (November 3)
The Last Trump (November 10)

See also
 List of film serials
 List of film serials by studio
 List of lost films

References

External links

1914 films
1914 lost films
American silent serial films
American black-and-white films
Universal Pictures film serials
Films based on American novels
Lost American films
Films directed by Henry MacRae
Films directed by Wilfred Lucas
Films with screenplays by Bess Meredyth
1910s action adventure films
American action adventure films
1910s American films
Silent adventure films